The Poppenbüttler Graben is a small bog in the borough of Hamburg, which is one of the natural monuments of the city. It runs parallel to Kupferteichweg road in Poppenbüttel. The bog is not accessible on paths. It drains into the Mellingbek stream.

Flora 
Among the plants that have colonised the bog are rushes, marsh gentian, bog asphodel, cranberries, sundew, sedges and lousewort. Three flowers that occur in the Poppenbüttler Graben have been named as the Flower of the Year Campaign in Germany: the marsh gentian (1980), the common sundew (1992) and the bog asphodel (2011).

External links 

 http://www.landesrecht.hamburg.de/jportal/portal/page/bshaprod.psml?nid=8&showdoccase=1&doc.id=jlr-PoppenNatDenkmSchVHApAnlage&st=lr Anlage zur Verordnung zum Schutz des Naturdenkmals Poppenbüttler Graben, retrieved 23 February 2017.
 http://www.landesrecht.hamburg.de/jportal/portal/page/bshaprod.psml?nid=0&showdoccase=1&doc.id=jlr-PoppenNatDenkmSchVHArahmen&st=lr Karte zur Verordnung, retrieved 23 February 2017.
 Botanischer Verein ND Poppenbüttler Graben, retrieved 23 February 2017.

References 

Natural monuments in Germany
Bogs of Hamburg
BPoppenbuttlerGraben